The 2010–11 Latvian Hockey League season was the 20th season of the Latvian Hockey League, the top level of ice hockey in Latvia. Nine teams participated in the league, and HK Liepājas Metalurgs won the championship.

Regular season

Playoffs
Quarterfinals
HK Ozolnieki/Monarhs - HS Riga/LSPA 2–0 on series
HK SMScredit - HK Zemgale/JLSS 2–0 on series
HK Liepajas Metalurgs - HS Prizma 2–0 on series
DHK Latgale - SC Energija 2–0 on series
Semifinals
HK Ozolnieki/Monarhs - HK SMScredit 3–0 on series
HK Liepajas Metalurgs - DHK Latgale 3–1 on series
Final
HK Liepajas Metalurgs - HK Ozolnieki/Monarhs 4–0 on series

External links
 Season on hockeyarchives.info

Latvian Hockey League
Latvian Hockey League seasons
Latvian